Muskogee County Sheriff's Office is the chief law enforcement agency in Muskogee County, Oklahoma, with primary jurisdiction in the unincorporated areas of the county. Consisting of sheriff's deputies, detention staff and support personnel, the department serves a population of over 70,000 people.

Incidents

Civil Forfeiture
On February 27, 2016, Muskogee County sheriff's deputies pulled over Eh Wah on U.S. Route 69 for a broken tail light. Eh Wah, a naturalized U.S. citizen who was carrying cash proceeds from a fundraiser from a Christian band, raised suspicions from the officers due to miscommunication during questioning. Deputies brought out a drug-sniffing dog that gave a positive alert, but did not find any drugs during the search that followed. The deputies instead found and seized $53,249 in cash, citing the "possession of drug proceeds"; the money however was going towards a Christian liberal arts college and an orphanage in Thailand. Although Eh Wah was not immediately charged at the scene, a warrant for his arrest was issued on April 5 for acquiring "proceeds from drug activity," citing the alert from the drug-sniffing dog, "inconsistent stories," and the inability to "confirm the money was his" as probable cause. Following national coverage of the incident in the Washington Post, the charges were dropped and the district attorney stated that a check would be issued to refund the full amount confiscated.

Fallen Deputies

Since the establishment of the Muskogee County Sheriff's Office, two deputies have died in the line of duty.

See also

List of law enforcement agencies in Oklahoma

References

Muskogee County, Oklahoma
Sheriffs' offices of Oklahoma
1907 establishments in Oklahoma